The 6th South American Under-23 Championships in Athletics were held in Montevideo, Uruguay at Pista Darwin Piñeyrúa on October 3–5, 2014.

Sprinters Aldemir da Silva Junior from Brazil, new 200m championship record in 20.50s, and Déborah Rodríguez from Uruguay, new 400m championship record in 52.53s, were awarded the titles for the best performances (mejor marca técnica) of the event.

Medal summary

For detailed results, see footnotes  The names of the Brazilian athletes in this result list were checked against a list of athletes selected for the event.

Men

Women

Medal table (unofficial)
The unofficial medal count is in agreement with an official publication.

Participation
According to an unofficial count, 310 athletes from 12 countries participated.  This is in agreement with the official numbers as published.

 (42)
 (8)
 (81)
 (29)
 (17)
 (19)
 (10)
 (16)
 (23)
 (2)
 (44)
 (19)

Team trophies
Brazil won the team trophies in all three categories.

Total

Male

Female

References

External links

Blog
Facebook

2014
2014 in Uruguayan sport
2014 in athletics (track and field)
2014 in South American sport
Sports competitions in Montevideo
International athletics competitions hosted by Uruguay
2014 in youth sport